Lydia Potechina (5 September 1883 – 30 April 1934) was a Russian actress. She emigrated to Germany in 1918. She was married to the Russian-German film producer Max Pfeiffer.

Selected filmography

Destiny (1921)
 The Conspiracy in Genoa (1921)
 Parisian Women (1921)
 Circus of Life (1921)
 Wandering Souls (1921)
 Barmaid (1922)
 Dr. Mabuse the Gambler (1922)
 Insulted and Humiliated (1922)
 The Green Manuela (1923)
 Fräulein Raffke (1923)
 Resurrection (1923)
 Carousel (1923)
 Comedy of the Heart (1924)
 Darling of the King (1924)
 Leap Into Life (1924)
 The Great Unknown (1924)
 Passion (1925)
 The Found Bride (1925)
 Women of Luxury (1925)
 Oh Those Glorious Old Student Days (1925)
 A Waltz Dream (1925)
 The Telephone Operator (1925)
 Athletes (1925)
 Peter the Pirate (1925)
 The Pride of the Company (1926)
 The Schimeck Family (1926)
 People to Each Other (1926)
 She Is the Only One (1926)
 Darling, Count the Cash (1926)
 The Three Mannequins (1926)
 The Wooing of Eve (1926)
 Countess Ironing-Maid (1926)
 The Third Squadron (1926)
 A Sister of Six (1926)
 We Belong to the Imperial-Royal Infantry Regiment (1926)
 Chaste Susanne (1926)
 The Pink Diamond (1926)
 The Three Mannequins (1926)
 Eva and the Grasshopper (1927)
 The Girl from Abroad (1927)
 A Serious Case (1927)
 The Bordellos of Algiers (1927)
 Always Be True and Faithful (1927)
 The Prince of Pappenheim (1927)
 German Women - German Faithfulness (1927)
 The Awakening of Woman (1927)
 The Transformation of Dr. Bessel (1927)
 His Late Excellency (1927)
 Homesick (1927)
 Looping the Loop (1928)
 Mikosch Comes In (1928)
 The Criminal of the Century (1928)
 Don Juan in a Girls' School (1928)
 A Better Master (1928)
 The Last Performance of the Circus Wolfson (1928)
 A Modern Casanova (1928)
 Do You Know That Little House on Lake Michigan? (1929)
 Love on Skis (1928)
 On the Reeperbahn at Half Past Midnight (1929)
 Gentlemen Among Themselves (1929)
 My Heart is a Jazz Band (1929)
 I Lost My Heart on a Bus (1929)
 The Circus Princess (1929)
 The Widow's Ball (1930)
 The White Devil (1930)
 I by Day, You by Night (1932)

Bibliography
 Hardt, Ursula. From Caligari to California: Erich Pommer's Life in the International Film Wars. Berghahn Books, 1996.

External links

1883 births
1934 deaths
Russian film actresses
Russian silent film actresses
20th-century Russian actresses
Actresses from Saint Petersburg
Emigrants from the Russian Empire to Germany